The 2009–10 season was the 64th season in Rijeka's history. It was their 19th season in the Prva HNL and 36th successive top tier season.

Competitions

Prva HNL

Classification

Results summary

Results by round

Matches

Prva HNL

Source: HRnogomet.com

Croatian Cup

Source: HRnogomet.com

Europa League

Source: HRnogomet.com

Squad statistics
Competitive matches only.  Appearances in brackets indicate numbers of times the player came on as a substitute.

See also
2009–10 Prva HNL
2009–10 Croatian Cup
2009–10 UEFA Europa League

References

External sources
 2009–10 Prva HNL at HRnogomet.com
 2009–10 Croatian Cup at HRnogomet.com 
 Prvenstvo 2009.-2010. at nk-rijeka.hr

HNK Rijeka seasons
Rijeka